This is a round-up of the 1982 Sligo Intermediate Football Championship. Easkey reclaimed their place in Senior football after a victory over near neighbours Castleconnor, and gained revenge for their boardroom elimination the previous year.

Quarter finals

Semi-finals

Sligo Intermediate Football Championship Final

Sligo Intermediate Football Championship
Sligo Intermediate Football Championship